Roberto Guerrero (10 October 1923 – 10 July 2011) was an Argentine cyclist. He competed in the team pursuit event at the 1948 Summer Olympics.

References

1923 births
2011 deaths
Argentine male cyclists
Olympic cyclists of Argentina
Cyclists at the 1948 Summer Olympics
Cyclists from Buenos Aires
20th-century Argentine people